Piedad Bonnett Vélez (Amalfi (Antioquia), 1951) is a Colombian poet, playwright and novelist.

Biography
She obtained a degree in Philosophy and Literature from the University of Los Andes where she has been professor at the Faculty of Arts and Humanities since 1981. She has published eight poetry books, many of which have been translated to Italian, English, French, Swiss, Greek and Portuguese, four novels, and five theater plays. Her short stories and essays have been published in both Colombian and international magazines and newspapers, and she has represented Colombia in numerous poetry festivals in Granada (Spain), Córdoba (Spain), Rosario (Argentina) and Medellín (Colombia), and literary festivals, including the Berlin International Literature Festival and Hay Festival in Segovia.

Her poetry, screenwriting and prose are described as having a profound link to her life experiences and vision as a middle class woman in a country torn by violence, inequality and conflict. Childhood, family life, and an enchantment and disenchantment with different kinds of love are present across her work, including filial, romantic and friendship, which she describes as one of the most beautiful and pure kinds. In 2013, she published her book “Lo que no tiene nombre,” a personal testimony about the struggles of her son with mental illness. The book received excellent reviews and she received recognition from Semana, Fundación Liderazgo y Democracia y Telefónica for her leadership in generating consciousness about mental health issues through literature.

Awards
 Honorary mention, Hispanic American Poetry Competition Octavio Paz, for De círculo y de ceniza
 Poetry National Prize, Instituto Colombiano de Cultura, 1994, for El hilo de los días
 9th Premio Casa de América de Poesía Americana, 2011, for Explicaciones no pedidas
 Poetry prize Poets of the Latin World, 2012
 Writer of the year in Portal de Poesía Contemporánea, 2013
 Poetry Prize José Lezama Lima, 2014, for Explicaciones no pedidas
 Prize Generation of the 27, 2016, for Los habitados

Books

Poetry
De círculo y ceniza (On circle and ashes). 1989.
Nadie en casa (Nobody at home). 1994.
El hilo de los días (The drift of days). 1995.
Ese animal triste (That sad animal). 1996.
Todos los amantes son guerreros (All lovers are warriors). 1997.
No es más que la vida (It’s no more than life). Arango Editores, 1998.  
demás es silencio (the rest is silence). 2003.
Tretas del débil (The weak’s ruses). 2004.
 Los privilegios del olvido, 2008
 Las herencias, 2008
 Explicaciones no pedidas, 2011

Novels
Después de todo (After all). 2001.
Para otros es el cielo (Heaven is for the others). 2004.
 Siempre fue invierno, Alfaguara, 2007,  
 El prestigio de la belleza, 2010
 Lo que no tiene nombre, (Alfaguara ) 2013
 Qué hacer con estos pedazos, Alfaguara 2021

Plays
 Gato por liebre, teatro 1991
 Se arrienda pieza, theatre
 Sanseacabó, theatre
 Gato por liebre, theatre 1991
 Algún día nos iremos 2013

Essays
 El hilo de los días, 1995
 Que muerde el aire afuera, 1997
 Imaginación y oficio, 2003

References

External links
Author's website 
Author's blog 
¿Quién es Piedad Bonnett? 

1951 births
Living people
People from Amalfi, Antioquia
20th-century Colombian poets
Colombian dramatists and playwrights
Colombian women poets
Women dramatists and playwrights
21st-century Colombian poets
20th-century Colombian women writers
21st-century Colombian women writers